Emanuel Brouwer (May 28, 1881 – July 6, 1954) was a Dutch gymnast who competed in the 1908 Summer Olympics. He was part of the Dutch gymnastics team, which finished seventh in the team event. In the individual all-around competition he finished 64th. He was born in Amsterdam and died in Huizen.

References

External links
 

1881 births
1954 deaths
Dutch male artistic gymnasts
Gymnasts at the 1908 Summer Olympics
Olympic gymnasts of the Netherlands
Gymnasts from Amsterdam